The 2003 Junior League World Series took place from August 10–16 in Taylor, Michigan, United States. La Mirada, California defeated Santiago, Panama in the championship game.

Teams

Results

United States Pool

International Pool

Elimination Round

References

Junior League World Series
Junior League World Series